Jocelyn (Op. 100) is a four-act opera by Benjamin Godard, set to a French libretto by Paul Armand Silvestre and the tenor Victor Capoul.  Based on the poem by Alphonse de Lamartine, the action takes place in Grenoble and the surrounding mountains during Corpus Christi at the close of the 18th century.  The score bears a dedication "A mon ami Daniel Barton".

This opera is remembered for Godard's most enduring composition, the tender berceuse (lullaby) for tenor, "Oh! ne t'éveille pas encore"  commonly known in English as Angels Guard Thee.

Jocelyn premièred on 25 February 1888 at Le Théâtre Royal de la Monnaie in Brussels with Pierre-Émile Engel creating the title role.  A production with a new cast, including Capoul in the title role, opened in Paris at the Théâtre-Lyrique-National on 13 October the same year.

Roles

Recordings
The popular Berceuse has been recorded by many tenors, including Tino Rossi, Capoul, John McCormack, Beniamino Gigli, Edmond Clément, Richard Crooks, Nicolai Gedda, Jussi Björling and Plácido Domingo, as well as by the cellist Pablo Casals.

Notes and references

Sources

Théâtre Royal de la Monnaie Digital archives. Premiere cast list: Jocelyn. Accessed 15 March 2011 
Godard, Benjamin (1888) Vocal score: Jocelyn Op.100. Paris: Choudens fils (nd.) at IMSLP
Upton, George Putnam and Borowski, Felix (1947). The Standard Concert Guide. Halcyon House.

Operas
1888 operas
Operas by Benjamin Godard
French-language operas
Opera world premieres at La Monnaie
Operas set in France